Walter C. Michels (1906–1975) was an Emeritus Professor of Physics at Bryn Mawr College. He was chairman of the department of physics at Bryn Mawr from 1936 to 1970. He was named emeritus professor in 1972.

Early life and education 
Michels grew up in Utica, New York.  Michels earned a degree in electrical engineering from Rensselaer Polytechnic Institute in 1927 and a Ph.D. from the California Institute of Technology.

Career 
He was a fellow of the National Research Council from 1930 to 1932 at Princeton University. In 1932 he left Princeton for Bryn Mawr. He became chairman of the department of physics in 1936, and held that position until 1970. During World War II, Michels directed the Mine Warfare Operational Research group. In 1972 he was made emeritus professor of physics. In 1960 he became the chairman of the Commission on College Physics until 1964. He was also a president of the American Association of Physics Teachers from 1956 to 1957.

Honors 
In 1964 Michels won the Oersted Medal of the AAPT.

Author 
Michels was an editor of the American Journal of Physics from 1959 to 1966 and also the International Dictionary of Physics and Electronics. He is an author and  co-author of several physics books, and a contributor to research on psycho-physics.

Death 
He died of a heart attack on 27 February 1975.

References 

1906 births
1975 deaths
Bryn Mawr College faculty
People from Utica, New York
Rensselaer Polytechnic Institute alumni
California Institute of Technology alumni
Fellows of the American Physical Society